Eranina pusilla is a species of beetle in the family Cerambycidae. It was described by Bates in 1874. It is known from Costa Rica and Mexico.

References

Eranina
Beetles described in 1874